Yvridiosuchus (meaning "hybrid crocodile") is an extinct genus of machimosaurid crocodyliform from the Middle Jurassic (Bathonian) Cornbrash Formation of England and the Sommet de la Grande Oolithe, Calvados, France. The type and only known species is Y. boutilieri. Yvridiosuchus is the oldest known member of Machimosaurini, a clade of large, predatory machimosaurids with powerful jaws and teeth. Yvridiosuchus was named on the basis that it has characteristics of both earlier machimosaurids and the derived machimosaurins, such as conical, blunt teeth. It co-existed with the more generalist machimosaurid Deslongchampsina.

References

Thalattosuchians
Prehistoric pseudosuchian genera
Prehistoric marine crocodylomorphs
Middle Jurassic crocodylomorphs
Bathonian life
Middle Jurassic reptiles of Europe
Fossils of England
Fossils of France
Fossil taxa described in 1866
fossil taxa described in 2019